Her Space Holiday is an eponymous album intended to be the final release by Marc Bianchi's solo project Her Space Holiday.

Track listing
 Anything For Progress
 Black Cat Balloons
 Shonanoka
 The Hummingbirds
 Come On All You Soldiers
 The Candle Jumped Over The Spoon
 Ghost In The Garden
 The Bullet, The Battle, The Trigger, The Barrel And Me
 The Death Of A Writer
 In The Time It Takes For The Lights To Change

References 
Review at lamusicblog.com

Her Space Holiday albums